"Marge's Son Poisoning" is the fifth episode of the seventeenth season of the American animated television series The Simpsons. It originally aired on the Fox network in the United States on November 13, 2005.

Plot
The family visits Paradise Pier, the Ferris wheel of which Marge has been looking forward all her life to riding, only to find out that it is being dismantled with its equipment being too old. Homer purchases a dumbbell, while Marge gets a tandem bicycle. When Marge wants to take the bike for a ride, she finds Homer and the kids unwilling to join her. Marge tries it on her own and repeatedly falls. Realizing that she might actually be lonely, Bart offers to go for a ride with her. They ride into an unincorporated part of the county and come upon a small village that features a tea house. Later, the tea house closes forever, causing Bart to invite Marge to his treehouse for tea.

Marge redecorates the treehouse and the pair goes off to get a new tea service; Bart gets a Krusty the Clown Tea Set. Outside the store, the bullies Jimbo, Dolph and Kearney accuse Bart of being a mama's boy, which causes Bart to rebel on her. Marge goes into a depression and eventually sells the bike to Chief Wiggum, Eddie and Lou.

Feeling bad, Bart offers to team with her in a karaoke contest. While seeing Principal Skinner and his mother Agnes perform, Marge has visions of a bad future for her and Bart, and she stops the show to prevent that future from occurring. She then lets Bart know that he can find his own way of life and that he should not worry about her because she has to worry about him. To make things better, she gives him a fire extinguisher to spray in front of the audience, including the bullies that tormented him.

Meanwhile, at Moe's tavern, Homer shows off the strength in one of his arms he has gained from working with the dumbbell, and Moe has an idea on how to capitalize on it. Moe takes Homer to the arm wrestling championships, where Homer readily wins the grand prize—a refund on his $50 admission fee—but finds that he really misses his wife. He drives home to reunite with Marge at karaoke, stopping to win a pie-eating contest along the way.

Production
TBA

Reception
Ryan Budke of 'The Huffington Post' praised the episode, saying "although, this episode wasn't the best this season, it was still a great one, and a vast improvement over the majority of shows they've had in the past couple of years.'"

References

External links 
 

The Simpsons (season 17) episodes
2005 American television episodes